Walter Ernest Christopher James, 4th Baron Northbourne (18 January 1896 – 17 June 1982), was an English agriculturalist, author and rower who competed in the 1920 Summer Olympics.

Life
James was the son of Walter James, 3rd Baron Northbourne, and his wife Laura Gwennlian (née Rice). He was educated at Sandroyd School and Eton College, then Oxford University where he studied agricultural science and was also an accomplished rower. In 1920 he was a member of the Oxford crew in the Boat Race. He was also a member of the Leander eight which won the silver medal for Great Britain rowing at the 1920 Summer Olympics, coming within half a length of winning. In 1921 he rowed for Oxford again in the Boat Race.

Lord Northbourne married in 1925 Katherine Louise, daughter of George Augustus Nickerson, of Boston and Dedham, Massachusetts, and Ellen Nickerson (née Touzalin, later wife of Sir Horace Hood). She died in 1980. Lord Northbourne survived her by two years and died in June 1982, aged 86. He was succeeded in his titles by his son Christopher.

Agriculture and writing

James later applied the theories of Rudolf Steiner to the family estate at Kent. In 1939 he travelled to Switzerland to visit the leading exponent of biodynamic agriculture, Ehrenfried Pfeiffer. The outcome of that visit was that he hosted, at his farm in Kent, the Betteshanger Summer School and Conference, the first biodynamic farming conference to be held in Britain.  It has been claimed that Northbourne coined the phrase "organic farming", but Northbourne explicitly denied this. In a letter to Ned Halley of the Rodale Press, he wrote: "I was certainly not the first to apply the word 'organic' to farming or gardening. I have never known the ideas and practices involved under any other name".  While he is certainly one of the central figures of the early organic movement, it is arguable that Albert Howard was of greater importance. Northbourne published Look to the Land in 1940, which raises many of the issues current to discussions of organic agriculture. After reading Look to the Land, the philosopher and author Marco Pallis contacted Northbourne and later introduced him to the writings of the Traditionalist (also known as Perennialist) philosophy. Northbourne eventually integrated this thinking into his own writings and life, and became a correspondent with many of the most prominent writers of this school, as well as with Thomas Merton.  He was also a frequent contributor to the quarterly journal Studies in Comparative Religion, which dealt with religious symbolism and the Traditionalist perspective.

Lord Northbourne was the English translator for the works of several fellow Traditionalists including René Guénon's major work, The Reign of Quantity and the Signs of the Times, Light on the Ancient Worlds by Frithjof Schuon, and Sacred Art in East and West by Titus Burckhardt.

Bibliography

Look to the Land (1940)
Religion in the Modern World (1963)
Looking Back on Progress (1970)

See also
List of Oxford University Boat Race crews
The Matheson Trust

References 

1896 births
1982 deaths
Alumni of Magdalen College, Oxford
People educated at Sandroyd School
English agronomists
English non-fiction writers
English male rowers
English religious writers
English translators
Olympic rowers of Great Britain
Olympic silver medallists for Great Britain
Olympic medalists in rowing
Organic farmers
Rowers at the 1920 Summer Olympics
Oxford University Boat Club rowers
Traditionalist School
20th-century British translators
English male non-fiction writers
Medalists at the 1920 Summer Olympics
20th-century English non-fiction writers
20th-century English male writers
People from Northbourne, Kent
Walter 4
20th-century agronomists